Sean Burke Clifford (born July 14, 1998) is an American football quarterback for the Penn State Nittany Lions. He has been the starting quarterback and team captain for the Nittany Lions since 2019. Clifford  returned to Penn State as the starter in 2022.

High school career
Clifford graduated from St. Xavier High School in Cincinnati in 2017. During his career, he passed for 4,004 yards and 30 touchdowns with a school record 1,100 rushing yards and 20 touchdowns as a quarterback. He committed to Penn State University to play college football.

College career

2017-2018 
After redshirting his first year at Penn State in 2017, Clifford spent 2018 as Trace McSorley's backup. He appeared in four games, completing five of seven passes for 195 yards with two touchdowns.

2019 

Clifford was named the starting quarterback in 2019. He was selected All-Big Ten honorable mention by the coaches and media, and named an Academic All-Big Ten honoree.

2020 
Clifford played in all nine games of a shortened season during the COVID-19 pandemic. He was 152-for-251 (60.6%) for 1,883 yards with 16 touchdowns and nine interceptions. Clifford again was named an Academic All-Big Ten honoree and earned a bachelor's degree in advertising and public relations following the 2020 fall semester.

2021 
Clifford started all 13 games of the season and finished 261-for-429 passing with 3,107 yards, 21 touchdowns and nine interceptions. He was honored in the 2021 NFF National Scholar-Athlete Class, selected to the Allstate AFCA Good Works Team, earned a spot on the Senior CLASS Award first team, named All-Big Ten honorable mention by the coaches and media, named Penn State's Big Ten Sportsmanship Award honoree, earned Academic All-Big Ten honors, and earned the team's Public Service and Lion's Pride Outstanding Senior Player Awards.

2022 
Clifford returned to Penn State for a fourth season as the starter in 2022.

Statistics

References

External links
Penn State Nittany Lions bio

1998 births
Living people
Players of American football from Cincinnati
American football quarterbacks
Penn State Nittany Lions football players
St. Xavier High School (Ohio) alumni